Melanoseris is a genus of flowering plants belonging to the family Asteraceae.

Its native range is Iran to Southern Central China and Northern Central Indo-China, Java.

Species
Species:

Melanoseris aitchisoniana 
Melanoseris astorensis 
Melanoseris atropurpurea 
Melanoseris beesiana 
Melanoseris bonatii 
Melanoseris bracteata 
Melanoseris brunoniana 
Melanoseris ciliata 
Melanoseris cyanea 
Melanoseris decipiens 
Melanoseris dolichophylla 
Melanoseris filicina 
Melanoseris gilgitensis 
Melanoseris graciliflora 
Melanoseris henryi 
Melanoseris hirsuta 
Melanoseris jilongensis 
Melanoseris kashmiriana 
Melanoseris lahulensis 
Melanoseris leiolepis 
Melanoseris leptantha 
Melanoseris lessertiana 
Melanoseris likiangensis 
Melanoseris macrantha 
Melanoseris macrocephala 
Melanoseris macrorhiza 
Melanoseris monocephala 
Melanoseris pectiniformis 
Melanoseris polyclada 
Melanoseris qinghaica 
Melanoseris rhombiformis 
Melanoseris sichuanensis 
Melanoseris souliei 
Melanoseris stewartii 
Melanoseris taliensis 
Melanoseris tenuis 
Melanoseris violifolia 
Melanoseris yunnanensis

References

Asteraceae
Asteraceae genera
Taxa named by Joseph Decaisne